Nemophas grayii is a species of beetle in the family Cerambycidae. It was described by Francis Polkinghorne Pascoe in 1859, originally under the genus Monohammus. It is known from Moluccas.

References

grayii
Beetles described in 1859